John William Breeden (November 7, 1913 – December 16, 1982) was an American football player who played one season with the Pittsburgh Pirates of the National Football League. He played college football at the University of Oklahoma.

References

1913 births
1982 deaths
American football running backs
Oklahoma Sooners football players
Pittsburgh Pirates (football) players
Players of American football from Texas
People from Haskell, Texas